THe interim governorship of Joaquín Suárez was the pre-Constitution government period of Uruguay which began after his appointment by the Constitutional Assembly as the interim substitute Governor and Captain General from 2nd December until 22nd December 1828 when the elected Governor and Captain General José Rondeau assumed his charge. During the twenty days of this brief period the cessation of all foreign authorities on the territory was ordered and several national symbols were established.

Background 

On 1 December 1828 the Constitutional Assembly in a vote decided to appoint José Rondeau as the future Provisional Governor of Uruguay, but because he was still in Argentina running an official seat, until he could come to Uruguay to pledge his oath, Joaquín Suárez was designated as substitute Governor and assumed his charge on 2 December. He had already led the nation when it was the Provincia Oriental, between 1826 and 1827.

Domestic policy 
During the first days of December the sessions of the Assembly and the Governor were suspended as meanwhile the authorities' seats were transferred to Canelones. This period of Joaquín Suárez as a substitute governor showed Suárez maintaining a «low profile» pace regarding reforms without making anything important, with the exception of the following policies.

In this term several featured regulations were approved. One of them was regarding the symbols of the country, being that the law of 6 December 1828 to create the original version of the National Flag of Uruguay, from a request of governor Suárez. The number of blued stripes was the same of the number of existing departments at that time. The only article in this law said:

On 13 December governor Suárez made a decree where it was declared the cessation of all foreign authorities on the territory, that because it gained its full independence and sovereignty, the jurisdiction of everything there had to belong to the local government. It also forbade courts, public officials and citizens in general to obey or fulfill orders from foreign powers. Besides that rules it also make a government promise to respect the people, the properties, the freedom of speech and freedom of press. According to Francisco Berra, this decree expressed the wishes of his creator, but also from its contents it looked like something typical of a dictator who has all the power of the State in his hands and to make Legislative and Judicial powers being subject to the Executive.

Another relevant law was the one approved on 19 December and coming into force on 22 of December, to establish the first National Cockade. The text of the article said:

See also 

 José Rondeau

References

Bibliography 

 
 

1828-12-02
1828 in Uruguay